Hill Township was a township of Pope County, Arkansas. It was located in the northeast part of the county.

References
 United States Board on Geographic Names (GNIS)
 United States National Atlas

External links
 US-Counties.com

Townships in Pope County, Arkansas
Townships in Arkansas